is a Japanese football player. He is the son of former footballer and manager Ichiro Otsuka.

Club career
Otsuka was born in Toyama Prefecture on July 25, 1995. After graduating from Kwansei Gakuin University, he joined J3 League club FC Ryukyu in 2018.

References

External links

Sho Otsuka at SportsTG

1995 births
Living people
Kwansei Gakuin University alumni
Association football people from Toyama Prefecture
Japanese footballers
Association football midfielders
J3 League players
FC Ryukyu players
Tokyo United FC players
Japanese expatriate footballers
Japanese expatriate sportspeople in Australia
Expatriate soccer players in Australia